Erdal Gezik is a contemporary writer on Alevis (Kurdish Alevis in particular) and honor crimes in Turkey.

Books
Etnik, politik dinsel sorunlar bağlamında – Alevi Kürtler, 2000, Ankara, Kalan Yayınları.
[Alevi Kurds; in perspective of ethnic, political and religious problems]
Eer, Identiteit en Moord; een vergelijkende studie tussen Nederland, Duitsland en Turkije, 2003, Utrecht.
[Honor, Identity and Crime: a comparative study between the Netherlands, Germany and Turkey]
Raa Haqi - Riya Haqi: Dersim Aleviliği İnanç Terimleri Sözlüğü, 2010, Ankara, Kalan Yayınları
[The path of True: a dictionary of Dersim Alevism]

Articles
Dersim 38 ve Öncesinde Toplumsal Yaşam – sözlü tarih metodu, 1998, Amsterdam.
[Dersim before 1938- Stories of daily life. A local guide for oral history.]
Doğu Aleviliğinde Seyitlik ve Yakın Tarihte Geçirdiği Değişimler, in: Yeni Binyılda Dersim (ed. A. Dersimi), Munich, 2000.
[The institution of Seyit in east Anatolian Alevism and its transformation in modern times]
Unutulmuş bir kral ve taraftarlarının hikayesi; yılanın Dersim maceralarının deneysel bir analizi, 2000, Munzur Dergisi nr 1, p. 4-29.
[The story of a forgotten king and his followers; an analysis of serpent beliefs in Dersim region]
Munzur ve Düzgün’un sıroluşlarının tarihsel bir analiz, 2000, Munzur Dergisi nr. 4, 15–29.
[A historical analysis of the disappearance of the saints Munzur and Düzgün]
Alevilik ve Hıristiyanlık: ortak geçmis mi, ortak gelecek mi, 2003, Munzur Dergisi, nr 15, p. 4-27.
[Alevism and Christianity: a common past or a common future?]
Seref, Kimlik ve Cinayet: Namus Cinayetleri Uzerine Bir Arastirma, Kalan Yayinlari:Ankara, 2003.
Aşiret’ten Cumhuriyet’e iki Alevi örneıi: Varto ve Koçgiri, 2005, Kırkbudak (Journal of Anatolian Folk Beliefs), nr 4, p. 27-48.
[From Tribe to Republic - two Alevi cases: Varto and Koçgiri]
Elke, Qerte Boz ve Gul u Gulistan: Dersim bölgesinde kültür ve dinsel geleneklere bir gece bakışı, 2008, Munzur Dergisi nr. 29, p. 4-26,
[Traditional beliefs in Dersim region; from the perspective of the night]
Ciralik – Hak, Pir ve Talip adına bir katkı sistemine dair, 2009, Munzur Dergisi nr. 31, p. 4-34.
[Ciralik – a material contribution system in the name of God, Pir and Talip]
Nesimi Kılagöz ile yaratılış üzerine, 2009, Munzur Dergisi nr. 32, p. 4-34.
[An Alevi version of creation by Nesimi Kılagöz]

Over de eermoorden en hun tegenstanders, 2002, Rechtshulp (maandblad voor de sociale praktijk), nr 6/7, p. 33-38.
[About honor crimes and its opponents]

Over Eerwraak, in: Wankele Waarden, 2003, Utrecht, p. 174-181
[About honor crimes]

References

Sources

Year of birth missing (living people)
Living people
Turkish sociologists